Leonhard Wächter (25 November 1762 — 11 February 1837) was German writer and historian who often published under the pseudonym Veit Weber. The work influenced several 18th- and early 19th-century Gothic novelists in both Britain and France. According to the Germanist James Taft Hatfield, it also had an influence on Goethe's Poem "".

References

1762 births
1837 deaths
18th-century German novelists
19th-century German novelists